Ingeborg Tryggvasdotter was the daughter of Tryggve Olafsson  (died 963), the great-granddaughter of Harald Fairhair, and the sister of Olaf I of Norway.
She married the Swedish earl Ragnvald Ulfsson, first the earl of Västergötland and later of Staraja Ladoga. They had two sons, Uleb Ragnvaldsson and Eilif, who became earls in Kievan Rus'.

References

Date of birth unknown
Date of death unknown
10th-century Norwegian women
10th-century Swedish women